Sweet Thursday is a 1954 novel by John Steinbeck. It is a sequel to Cannery Row and set in the years after the end of World War II. According to Steinbeck, "Sweet Thursday" is the day between Lousy Wednesday and Waiting Friday.

Plot summary 
Doc returns to a failed Western Biological Laboratories and a changed Cannery Row after serving in the army during World War II. Mack and the Boys are still living in the Palace Flophouse, but Lee Chong has sold his general store to Joseph and Mary Rivas. Since the death of its original owner Dora, the local brothel, The Bear Flag Restaurant, is now being run by Dora's older sister Fauna, a former mission worker previously known as Flora. Under Fauna, the girls of the Bear Flag study etiquette and posture with the goal of joining Fauna's list of "gold stars," former employees of the Bear Flag who have married and left their employ there.

As Doc tries to rebuild his neglected business, the latest Bear Flag resident Suzy is causing trouble. Fauna knows Suzy isn't cut out to be a working girl, but her soft heart always causes her to fall for a hard luck story. Deciding to make Suzy one of her gold star girls, Fauna plots to throw Suzy into the arms of an unwitting Doc and enlists the aid of Mack and the Boys.

After a disastrous party hosted by Mack and the Boys, Suzy leaves the Bear Flag, but not to marry Doc. Choosing to live alone, Suzy moves into an empty boiler in a vacant lot and takes a job at the local diner, the Golden Poppy. While Cannery Row is stunned over Suzy's actions and Doc wrestles with a critical project, Hazel, one of the Boys living in the Palace Flophouse, struggles with his own demons. Having been told by Fauna in an astrological reading he will become President of the United States, Hazel fights destiny. To practice for high office, Hazel understands that he must learn to make difficult decisions — one of which is breaking Doc's arm, for he’s realized that this, arousing Suzy's sympathy, is the only way to bring the couple together. Realizing Doc's broken arm will keep him from a much-needed collecting expedition, Mack and the Boys teach Suzy to drive a car. Suzy and the injured Doc head off to the coast for the collecting expedition.

History 
The novel was adapted into the 1955 Rodgers and Hammerstein Broadway musical Pipe Dream, which was nominated for nine Tony Awards.  The movie version of the book's predecessor, Cannery Row, incorporates several of the story lines in Sweet Thursday.

Musical references 
 In 1960 Duke Ellington and Billy Strayhorn wrote and recorded Suite Thursday inspired by the Steinbeck novel and dedicated to the author.
 The song "Sweet Thursday" from California singer/songwriter Matt Costa's 2006 release Songs We Sing is an allusion to the work. The song also incorporates aspects of other Steinbeck works including Tortilla Flat (1935) and The Grapes of Wrath (1939).

References

Further reading
 Morsberger, Robert E. "'Pipe Dream' or Not So Sweet Thursday." Steinbeck Quarterly 21.03-04 (Summer/Fall 1988): 85-96.

External links
 

1954 American novels
American novels adapted into films
History of Monterey County, California
Novels by John Steinbeck
Novels set in California
Sequel novels
Viking Press books